Gierszowice  (German Giersdorf) is a village in the administrative district of Gmina Olszanka, within Brzeg County, Opole Voivodeship, in south-western Poland.

See also
Brzeg water tower

References

Gierszowice